Wolfgang Kraus (born 20 August 1953) is a former German football player.

The son of the former Frankfurt footballer Willi 'Scheppe' Kraus (born 3 December 1926, died 1993) appeared in 326 Bundesliga matches for Eintracht Frankfurt and Bayern Munich and scored 47 goals. Mostly he was used in the midfield.

After his active career he became in November 1986 sports director at Frankfurt but was fired in September 1988 after less than two years. The reason was the sale of star player and idol of the public Lajos Détári. Kraus later stated that he had nothing to do with the sale of Détari.

Honours
Bayern Munich
 Bundesliga: 1979–80, 1980–81
 DFB-Pokal: 1981–82, 1983–84
 European Cup: runner-up 1981–82

Eintracht Frankfurt
 DFB-Pokal: 1973–74, 1974–75

References

External links
 Wolfgang Kraus at eintracht-archiv.de 
 

1953 births
Living people
German footballers
Germany B international footballers
Eintracht Frankfurt players
FC Bayern Munich footballers
FC Zürich players
Bundesliga players
Eintracht Frankfurt non-playing staff
Association football midfielders
Footballers from Frankfurt
West German footballers
West German expatriate footballers